The Journal of Speech, Language, and Hearing Research is a monthly online-only peer-reviewed scientific journal covering all aspects of interpersonal communication. It was established in 1936 as the Journal of Speech and Hearing Disorders, which was merged with the Journal of Speech and Hearing Research (which had been established in 1958) to form the Journal of Speech and Hearing Research in 1991. The word "Language" was added to the title in 1997. It is published by the American Speech–Language–Hearing Association and the editors-in-chief are Bharath Chandrasekaran (University of Pittsburgh), Sean Redmond (University of Utah), and Frederick Gallun (Veterans Affairs Medical Center). According to the Journal Citation Reports, the journal has a 2017 impact factor of 1.906, ranking it 8th out of 25 journals in the category "Audiology and Speech-Language Pathology".

References

External links

Monthly journals
Publications established in 1936
Online-only journals
English-language journals
Communication journals
Linguistics journals
Audiology journals
Academic journals published by learned and professional societies of the United States